Friendliness is the second album by the British rock group Stackridge.  The album was produced by Stackridge and Victor Gamm at Sound Techniques, London.  This was the only Stackridge album to be released on the MCA Records label both in the UK and the USA.

Track listing 

"Lummy Days" (Davis) 3:22
"Friendliness (Part 1)" (Warren) 2:29
"Anyone for Tennis" (Warren) 2:32
"There is No Refuge" (Warren) 3:24
"Syracuse The Elephant" (Walter, Davis) 8:46
"Amazingly Agnes" (Warren) 3:30
"Father Frankenstein is Behind Your Pillow" (Warren) 3:35
"Keep On Clucking" (Walter, Davis) 4:03
"Story of My Heart" (Slater) 2:03
"Friendliness (Part 2)" (Warren) 1:55
"Teatime" (Walter, Davis) 5:51

Bonus Tracks from the 2006 re-issue on Angel Air.

"Everyman" (Davis, Warren) 4:27 (b-side)
"Purple Spaceships Over Yatton" (Walter, Davis) 6:39 (b-side)
"C'est La Vie" (Warren, Davis) 3:21 (b-side)
"Do The Stanley" (Wabadaw, Sleeve) 2:54 (single)

Personnel

Andy Cresswell-Davis - guitar, vocals, keyboards
James Warren - guitar, vocals; bass on "Keep on Clucking"
Michael "Mutter" Slater - flute, vocals; piano on "Story of My Heart"
Michael Evans - violin, cello, vocals   
Jim "Crun" Walter - bass; guitar on "Keep on Clucking"
Billy "Sparkle" Bent - drums

References

Stackridge albums
1972 albums